Syntrichura is a genus of moths in the subfamily Arctiinae.

Species
 Syntrichura melaena Dognin, 1907
 Syntrichura placida Druce, 1884
 Syntrichura sphecomorpha Bryk, 1953
 Syntrichura virens Butler, 1876

References

Natural History Museum Lepidoptera generic names catalog

Arctiinae